John Lee Hooker was an American blues singer and guitarist who recorded from 1948 to 2001.  His discography includes recordings issued by various record companies in different formats.

In February 2022, it was announced that BMG had acquired Hooker's music interests from his estate. The agreement included his entire publishing catalog in addition to his recorded and performance royalty income, as well as a selection of Hooker’s recorded catalog spanning Alone, Vol. 1 (1980) through to Black Night Is Falling (2020).

Charting singles

Albums
The Detroit Years (recordings 1948–1955)
1959 – House of the Blues (Chess)
1960 – The Blues (Crown) – early Modern tracks
1961 – Sings the Blues (Crown) – Modern tracks
1961 – John Lee Hooker Plays & Sings the Blues (Chess) – 1950–52 recordings
1961 – John Lee Hooker Sings Blues (King) – reissued as Moanin' and Stompin and Don't You Remember Me, Texas Slim 1948–50 tracks
1962 – Folk Blues (Crown) – 1951–54 recordings
1963 – The Great John Lee Hooker (Crown) – Modern tracks
1963 – Don't Turn Me from Your Door (Atco) 1953/61 recordings
1963 – John Lee Hooker & Big Maceo Merriweather (Fortune)
1966 – John Lee Hooker & His Guitar (Advent)
1967 – Original Folk Blues (Kent)
1969 – No Friend Around (Advent/Red Lightnin')
1970 – Alone (Specialty) – 1948–51 recordings
1971 – Goin' Down Highway 51 (Specialty) – 1948–51 recordings
1971 – Coast to Coast Blues Band – Any Where – Any Time – Any Place (United Artists)
1972 – Johnny Lee (GreeneBottle) – 2LP
1973 – John Lee Hooker's Detroit (United Artists) – 3LP
1973 – Mad Man Blues (Chess) – 2LP compilation
1973 – Hooker, Hopkins, Hogg (Specialty-Sonet)
1973 – Slim's Stomp (Polydor) – King tracks
1979 – Southern Blues (Savoy)
1981 – Blues for Big Town (Chess) – various artists compilation featuring unissued early 1950s recordings
1987 – Gotham Golden Classics – Rare Recordings (Collectables)
1987 – Detroit Blues (Krazy Kat)
1989 – 40th Anniversary Album (DCC) – reissued on Demon as Detroit Lion
1990 – Boogie Awhile (Krazy Kat) – 2LP
1999 – Savoy Blues Legends, 1948–1949 (SavoyJazz/Atlantic) – reissued on Savoy
2000 – The Unknown John Lee Hooker (Krazy Kat) – 1951 tracks, reissued 2004 on Eagle as Jack O'DiamondsThe Chicago Years (recordings 1955–1964)
1959 – I'm John Lee Hooker (Vee-Jay)
1960 – Travelin' (Vee-Jay)
1961 – The Folk Lore of John Lee Hooker (Vee-Jay)
1962 – Burnin' (Vee-Jay)
1962 – The Best of John Lee Hooker (Vee-Jay) – compilation
1963 – The Big Soul of John Lee Hooker  (Vee-Jay)
1964 – On Campus (Vee-Jay) – I Want To Shout The Blues on European Stateside, reissued as Big Band Blues on Buddah
1965 – ...And Seven Nights (Verve-Folkways) – 1964 British recordings, reissued with brass overdubs as On the Waterfront on Wand and several later versions
1965 – Is He the World's Greatest Blues Singer? (Vee-Jay) – compilation, reissued on Exodus
1974 – Gold (Vee-Jay) – compilation, contains I'm John Lee Hooker and The Big Soul of
1974 – The Best of John Lee Hooker (GNP Crescendo) – 20 classic Vee-Jay tracks
1974 – In Person (Vee-Jay/Dynasty) – late Vee-Jay tracks
1989 – The Hook – 20 Years of Hits & Hot Boogie (Chameleon) – compilation of Vee-Jay licensed recordings
1993 – John Lee Hooker on Vee-Jay 1955–1958 (Vee-Jay) – compilation
2014 – I'm Going Home (Devils Tunes) – June 10, 1958, Vee-Jay rehearsal session with rare recordingsThe Folk Years (recordings 1959–1963)
1959 – The Country Blues of John Lee Hooker (Riverside) – reissued in 1963 as How Long Blues (Battle), and in 1969 as Tupelo Blues (Riverside)
1960 – That's My Story (Riverside) – reissued 1963 on Battle as The Blues Man
1962 – John Lee Hooker (Galaxy) – reissued as The King of Folk Blues (America)
1963 – Live at Sugar Hill (Galaxy)
1964 – Burning Hell (Riverside) – recorded 1959
1964 – Concert at Newport (Vee-Jay) – reissued on Fantasy with bonus tracks as Live at Newport
1966 – Teachin' the Blues (Guest Star) – 1961 recordings 
1969 – That's Where It's At! (Stax) – 1961 recordings
1971 – Detroit Special (Atlantic) – compilation, Don't Turn Me From Your Door plus bonus tracks
1972 – Boogie Chillun (Fantasy) – Live at Sugar Hill plus bonus tracks, reissued on Ace as Live at Sugar Hill Vol. 1 & 2
1972 – Black Snake (Fantasy 2-set) – reissue of Riverside "The Country Blues and That's My Story1979 – Sittin' Here Thinkin' (Muse) – 1961 Savoy recordings, reissued as Sad and Lonesome2002 – Live at Sugar Hill, Vol. 2 (Fantasy) – unissued 1961 recordings featuring a third session
The ABC Years (recordings 1965–1974)
1965 – It Serve You Right to Suffer (Impulse!)
1966 – The Real Folk Blues (Chess) – new Chicago recordings
1967 – Live at Cafe Au Go Go (BluesWay)
1967 – Urban Blues (BluesWay)
1968 – On the Waterfront (Wand) – … And Seven Nights with brass overdubs
1969 – Simply the Truth (BluesWay)
1969 – If You Miss 'Im...I Got 'Im (BluesWay)
1970 – I Feel Good! (Carson) – European recordings, reissued on Jewel (1972)
1970 – I Wanna Dance All Night (America) – 1969 European recordings,
1971 – Get Back Home in the U.S.A. (Black & Blue) – 1969 European recordings reissued with additional tracks as Get Back Home1971 – Hooker 'n Heat (Liberty) – reissued on Rhino as Infinite Boogie1971 – Endless Boogie (ABC)
1972 – Never Get Out of These Blues Alive (ABC) - With Van Morrison on Never Get Out Of These Blues Alive1972 – Live at Soledad Prison (ABC)
1973 – Kabuki Wuki (BluesWay) – 1971 recording
1973 – Born in Mississippi, Raised Up in Tennessee (ABC) - With Van Morrison on Going Down1974 – Free Beer and Chicken (ABC)
1991 – More Real Folk Blues: The Missing Album (Chess) – also issued with The Real Folk Blues as The Complete Chess Folk Blues SessionsThe Rosebud Years (recordings 1975–2001)
1976 – Alone Vol 1 (Labor) – live recordings, reissued on Tomato
1976 – Alone – Live in New York Vol 2 (MMG) – reissued on Tomato
1978 – Live + Well (Ornament)
1978 – The Cream  (Tomato) – live recordings, reissued with bonus tracks on Charly
1979 – Live in 1978 (Lunar)
1981 – Hooker 'n' Heat Recorded Live at the Fox Venice Theatre (Rhino, various artists)
1986 – Jealous (Pulsa) – reissued on Point Blank 1996 and Shout! Factory with bonus tracks
1989 – The Healer (Chameleon)
1990 – The Hot Spot – featuring Miles Davis
1991 – Mr. Lucky (Pointblank) - With Van Morrison on guitar and vocals, also features Carlos Santana, Johnny Winter, Albert Collins, Ry Cooder, Booker T. Jones, Keith Richards, etc. 
1992 – Boom Boom (Pointblank) – reissued on Shout!Factory with bonus tracks
1995 – Chill Out (Pointblank) – reissued on Shout!Factory with bonus tracks
1997 – Don't Look Back (Pointblank/Virgin) – reissued on Shout!Factory with bonus tracks
1998 – The Best of Friends (Pointblank) compilation 1986–1998 incl one new track – reissued on Shout!Factory download with bonus track
2003 – Face to Face (Eagle) new recordings
2016 – Boom Boom – Live On Air 1976 (Laser media) 14 classics, live (bootleg on air) recordings with guitars, bass, and drums
2019 – Black Night Is Falling: Live At Rising Sun – recordings from 1977 at the Rising Sun Celebrity Jazz Club in Montreal, QuebecCompilation CDs
1982 – Tantalizing with the Blues (MCA) UK only 1965–1971
1990 – That's My Story/The Folk Blues of (Ace) – the two original Riverside LPs on one CD
1990 – That's Where It's At (Stax) reissue of Florida recordings from 1961
1991 – The Ultimate Collection 1948–1990 (Rhino 2CDbox)
1991 – The Complete Chess Folk Blues Sessions (Chess/MCA) the Ralph Bass 1966 Chicago session, reissued in 2002– see below
1991 – Half a Stranger (Mainstream) Modern tracks 1948–1955 incl unedited masters
1991 – Free Beer and Chicken (BeatGoesOn/MCA) recorded 1974
1991 – Don't Turn Me from Your Door (Atlantic/Atco) – 1953 and 1961 recordings with bonus tracks
1991 – The Best of John Lee Hooker 1965 to 1974 (Universal) – Impulse, Chess and ABC/Bluesway recordings
1991 – Blues Brother – 24 Vintage Sensation Recordings 1948–1951 (Ace) – Only issued in UK  (tracks also issued on Graveyard Blues and Everybody’s Blues, except for Boogie Chillen)  
1992 – Graveyard Blues (Specialty/Ace) 1948–1950 – Besman/Sensation tracks
1992 – The Boogie Man (Charly DIG 5) – "book"-box 1948–1966 recordings, except for Modern
1993 – Everybody's Blues (Specialty/Ace) – Besman tracks of 1950–51 plus two 1954 sessions direct for Specialty
1993 – The Legendary Modern Recordings 1948–1954 (Flair/Ace) – the original singles
1993 – Urban Blues (MCA) – the original BluesWay album  of the two 1967 sessions plus three prev. unissued bonus tracks from the 1969  session 
1993 – John Lee Hooker on Vee-Jay 1955–1958 (Vee-Jay) – 22 chrono tracks
1993 – The Early Years (Tomato & Rhino) – 2-set with 30 Vee-Jay classics
1994 – Original Folk Blues...Plus (Ace) – the original Kent LP plus 6 extra tracks
1995 – Alternative Boogie – Early Studio Recordings, 1948–1952 (Capitol) – 3CD with Besman alternate takes
1995 – The Very Best of John Lee Hooker (Rhino)
1996 – Live at the Café Au Go-Go (and Soledad Prison) (Universal) – 1966 with Muddy Waters' band and 1972
1996 – Rare Hooker (Charly) – 22 very rare recordings from 1948 to 1961
1998 – Trilogy – 64 recordings from 1949 to 1969 (Hearts Of Darkness) – 3CD 
1998 – Gotham Golden Classics – The Rare Recordings (Collectables) – 1951–52 ”pirate” recordings 
1998 – The Best of Friends (Virgin/Pointblank) – 13 recordings 1987–1998 (with one extra bonus on Shout!Factory issued 2007)
1998 – I'm John Lee Hooker (Charly -with bonus tracks) – his very first LP, 1955–1959 recordings – reissued on SNAP in 2003 and without bonus tracks on Shout!Factory in 2007
1998 – The Complete 50's Chess Recordings  (Chess 2CD) – anthology featuring the tracks from House of the Blues and Plays and Sings the Blues (1951–52) plus several bonus tracks from Fortune 1954 incl Blues For Big Town1999 – 20th Century Masters, The Millennium Collection – The Best of John Lee Hooker (MCA Records)
1999 – Travelin (Charly)  – 1960 session with bonus tracks, reissued on SNAP in 2003
2000 – The Complete 1964 Recordings (RPM) – last Vee-Jay session 1964 plus British London recordings, the British tracks reissued with brass overdubs as The London 1965 Sessions on Sequel
2000 – Burnin (Charly) – the fourth VJ LP 1962 with bonus tracks, reissued on SNAP in 2003
2000 – The Complete – Vol. 1 1948–49 (Body & Soul) – 2CD
2000 – The Complete – Vol. 2 1949 (Body & Soul) – 2CD
2000 – The Folk Lore of John Lee Hooker (Charly)  – his third VJ LP with bonus tracks, reissued on SNAP in 2003
2001 – The Complete – Vol. 3 1949–50 (Body & Soul) – 2CD
2001 – House Rent Boogie (Ace) – rare early 1950s Modern recordings
2001 – Testament (Charly/Snapper) – 3CD box Vee-Jay recordings
2002 – The Complete – Vol. 4 1950–51 (Body & Soul) – 2CD
2002 – The Real Folk Blues/More Real Folk Blues  (Chess) – 1966 recordings, reissue of 1991 CD The Complete Chess Folk Blues Sessions
2002 – Giant of Blues (FruitTree 2CD) – Charly license featuring 20 of the Testament tracks
2003 – Boogie Chillen''' (Audio Fidelity) – 1949–1952 compilation by Besman and Siracuse (engineer)
2003 – Blues Immortal (Blues Kingpins) (Virgin) – 1948–1955 Modern anthology
2004 – Early Years – The Classic Savoy Sessions (Metro Doubles 2CD) – recorded 1948 and 1961 from Savoy Blues Legends (Savoy in 2000 and 2002) and the 1961 Savoy recordings from Sittin' Here Thinkin (32Blues in 2004 with the bonus track)
2004 – I'm a Boogie Man (Varèse Sarabande) – Vintage 1948–1953 Texas Slim and John Lee Booker (King/De Luxe tracks featuring all the King singles)
2004 – The Cream (Charly) – The Tomato LP recorded in 1977, reissued with five extra bonus tracks (a total of 20 live tracks)
2004 – The Complete – Vol. 5 1951–53 (Body & Soul) – 2CD
2005 – The Complete – Vol. 6 1953–54 (Body & Soul) – 2CD
2006 – Hooker (Shout!Factory) – 4 CD chronological anthology covering 84 tracks of his entire career
2006 – The Boogie Man 1948–1955 (Charly) – 4-CD box set with pseudonym and Modern recordings
2007 – Gold (Hip-O Select) – 2CD 1948–2001 chronological anthology
2008 – The Intro Collection – The Very Best of the King of Blues Guitar (Union Square 3CD) – 9 Savoy and 36 Vee-Jay classics
2009 – John Lee Hooker Anthology: 50 Years (Shout! Factory) – 2CD 1948–1998 chronological anthology
2009 – From Detroit to Chicago 1954–1958 (SagaBlues46) – Modern, Battle, and early Vee-Jay singles
2010 – At His Very Best (MetroUnionSquare 2CD) – Vee-Jay compilation with some live recordings
2010 – Blues in Transition (Jasmine 2CD) – Vee-Jay recordings 1956–1959 plus the two Riverside sessions 1959 (50 tracks)
2010 – The Essential Collection (Union Square TIN 3CD) – Vee-Jay from above Metro 2CD plus several extras 
2016 – Simply John Lee Hooker (Union Square TIN 3CD) – Mostly early rare pirate and Modern recordings and some Vee-Jay
2016 – The Great John Lee Hooker (Southern Routes) – a 26 track CD featuring famous (and other classic) Modern and Sensation recordings 1948–1953  
2016 – The Modern, Chess & VeeJay Singles Collection 1949–62 (Acrobat Music 4CD) – all his singles for the three labels, A- and B-sides (101 tracks)
2017 – Whiskey & Wimmen – John Lee Hooker's Finest (Concord/Vee-Jay) – a CD/LP including songs from Vee-Jay, Stax, Specialty and Riverside
2017 – King of the Boogie (Concord/Craft) – 5 CD chronological anthology covering 100 tracks of his entire career (only 38 tracks also on "Hooker")
2017 – Gotta Boogie Gotta Sing (Jasmine) – 2 CD-set covering 52 Modern and pirate recordings 1948–1954
2018 – Boogie Chillen' – 50 All-Time Classics (SoulJam) – 2-set CD compilation 1948–1961

Films
 The Blues Brothers (1980)
 John Lee Hooker & Furry Lewis DVD (1995)
 John Lee Hooker Rare Performances 1960–1984 DVD (2002)
 Come See About Me DVD (2004)
 John Lee Hooker – Bits and Pieces About …'' DVD + CD (2006)

Notes

Discographies of American artists
Blues discographies